Días Nuevos is the tenth studio album by Peruvian singer-songwriter Gian Marco released by 11 y 6 Discos in 2011. It was his first album released with his new label.

Commercial performance
The album had great success throughout Latin America and was certified triple platinum in Perú in July 2011. In December 2011 the album was certified quintuple platinum in Perú, breaking a record and becoming the best selling album in Perú of 2011. The album won Best Singer-Songwriter Album at the 2011 Latin Grammy Awards. He tied for the award with Amaury Gutiérrez making it his second time winning in this category and also marked the first time two artists tied for the award. That same year the album's success also won him the Premios Luces awards for Artist of the Year and Song of the Year for Dime Dónde. It is one of the best-selling album in Perú

Track listing
All credits adapted from AllMusic.

Certifications and sales

Awards
12th Latin Grammy Awards

|-
|rowspan=2|2011
|style="text-align:center;"|Días Nuevos
|style="text-align:center;"|Best Singer-Songwriter Album
|
|-

Premios Luces de El Comercio

|-
|rowspan=2|2011
|style="text-align:center;"|Dime Dónde
|style="text-align:center;"|Song of the Year
|
|-
|style="text-align:center;"|Himself
|style="text-align:center;"|Artist of the Year
|
|}

References

Gian Marco albums
2011 albums
Spanish-language albums
Latin Grammy Award for Best Singer-Songwriter Album